Fearless is the second studio album by American singer-songwriter Taylor Swift. It was released November 11, 2008, by Big Machine Records in the U.S. and Canada, and an international edition was released on March 9, 2009. Written largely by Swift while she was promoting her 2006 eponymous debut album in 2007–2008, Fearless features additional songwriting credits from Liz Rose, Hillary Lindsey, Colbie Caillat, and John Rich. Swift wrote seven of the thirteen songs on the standard edition by herself and, in her debut as a record producer, co-produced all songs with Nathan Chapman.

Fearless is a country pop album featuring traditional country instruments such as banjos, fiddles, mandolins and acoustic guitars, intertwined with electric guitars. Music critics noted the album's crossover appeal brought by the influences of different styles including pop, folk, and rock. Inspired by Swift's feelings as a teenager, the lyrics explore themes of romance, heartache, and aspirations. The album's title refers to the overarching theme of all of its tracks, as they altogether depict Swift's courage to embrace the challenges of love.

After the release of Fearless, Swift embarked on the Fearless Tour, which ran from April 2009 to July 2010. Five songs were released as singles, including three US Billboard Hot 100 top-ten entries: "Love Story", "You Belong with Me", and "Fearless". "Love Story" and "You Belong with Me" were successful on both country and pop radio. The album spent eleven weeks atop the U.S. Billboard 200 and was certified Diamond by the Recording Industry Association of America. It peaked in the top five of albums charts and received multi-platinum certifications in Australia, Canada, New Zealand, and the U.K., and has sold twelve million copies worldwide by April 2021.

Music critics complimented Swift's songwriting craftsmanship on Fearless for offering radio-friendly tunes and engaging narratives, though some deemed the production formulaic. Fearless won Album of the Year at both the Country Music Association Awards and the Academy of Country Music Awards in 2009. At the 2010 Grammy Awards, it won Album of the Year and Best Country Album. The album featured on Rolling Stone 2022 list of the 100 Greatest Country Albums of All Time. Following the 2019 dispute regarding the ownership of Swift's back catalog, she released a re-recording, Fearless (Taylor's Version), on April 9, 2021.

Background 
Taylor Swift signed a publishing contract with Sony/ATV Tree Publishing in 2004 to become a songwriter; at fourteen years old, she became the youngest Sony/ATV signee in its history. After signing a recording contract with Nashville-based Big Machine Records in 2005 to become a country music singer, Swift wrote songs with other Music Row songwriters and recorded her eponymous debut album with producer Nathan Chapman for four months near the end of 2005. Released on October 24, 2006, it was the longest-charting album on the U.S. Billboard 200 of the 2000s decade, and established Swift as one of country music's rising stars. Its third single, "Our Song", made Swift the youngest person to single-handedly write and sing a number-one song on the Billboard Hot Country Songs chart. Her success was rare for a female teenage artist, as country music had been dominated by mostly middle-aged male musicians.

To promote Taylor Swift, Swift toured as the opening act for other country musicians, including Rascal Flatts and George Strait, during 2007–2008. While on tour, she continued writing songs for her follow-up album mostly by herself on the road, "at the concert venue... a quiet place in some room at the venue, like the locker room". In addition to self-penned material, Swift had songwriting sessions with Liz Rose, with whom she had largely collaborated on her first album. She also wrote with musician John Rich and singer-songwriter Colbie Caillat.

Writing and production 
Swift first came up with the direction for her second studio album after writing "Fearless", a song about an imaginary "best first date", while touring with Brad Paisley in mid-2007. Swift's songwriting was influenced by Paisley and Sheryl Crow's approach to expressing emotions. Continuing on the romantic themes of her first album, Swift chose to write songs about her personal feelings and observations of the world around her from the perspectives of a teenage girl, instead of the luxurious lifestyle brought by her newfound fame, to ensure her fans could relate to her songs: "I really try to write more about what I feel and guys and love because that's what fascinates me more than anything else – love and what it does to us and how we treat people and how they treat us. So pretty much every song on the album has a face that I associate with it."

Swift usually started writing by identifying a core emotion she wanted to convey through the melody on guitar. For other songs, she sometimes came up with the title first before writing the hook. While some songs were inspired by Swift's personal relationships, she said that most songs were dramatized observations rather than real-life experiences: "I've gone through breakups and the core emotions behind them, but it doesn't take much to get that sort of emotion out in a song, luckily for me." She explained that certain emotions on her songs such as frustration or heartbreak came easily without her actually going through emotional turmoil. By July 2007, Swift had written as many as 75 songs. She recorded the album within a few months after touring with George Strait. Chapman, who produced Swift's debut, returned as producer, and recording took place at studios in Tennessee, including six in Nashville and one in Franklin.

During the recording sessions, Swift emphasized the authenticity of the songs' emotional sentiments over technical rigidity: "I think it's the writer in me that's a little more obsessed with the meaning of the song than the vocal technique." By March 2008, Swift had recorded six songs, including one co-written by and featuring Caillat, "Breathe"; Swift had used Caillat's 2007 song "Bubbly" as a reference point during the recording sessions, because of its simple arrangements and honest sentiments. Apart from newly penned songs, Swift recorded a few that she had written for her debut album, believing there were stories that deserved to be put out. Swift made her debut as a record producer, co-producing all tracks with Chapman. The standard edition consists of thirteen tracks, which Swift had planned because she considered thirteen her lucky number. Of the thirteen tracks, Swift wrote seven by herself; the remaining were co-written with Caillat, Rose, Rich, and Hillary Lindsey. Recording took place within eight months and finished in October 2008, when Swift completed the track "Forever & Always" just before Fearless was mastered and published.

Composition

Lyrics 
Like Swift's debut album, Fearless prominent themes are love and life from a high school teenage girl's perspective. The songs in Fearless examine those themes with a more nuanced and mature observation. Swift embraced country music's narrative songwriting to convey her coming of age. She wrote the track "Fifteen" during her freshman high school year in Hendersonville, Tennessee. In the narrative, Swift and another girl named Abigail—her real-life high school friend—go through teenage love and heartbreak together. As the song concludes, Swift realizes she could accomplish more than dating high school senior boys. Music critics highlighted "Fifteen" as an example of Swift's songwriting about teenage themes, both with a starry-eyed innocence and a sense of nostalgia.

Many of Fearless songs are about starry-eyed romance and use imagery associated with fairy tales, such as princes, princesses, white horses, and kissing in the rain. The title track "Fearless" is Swift's imagination of a perfect first date, on which she is caught in her "best dress" in the rain. Inspired by a love interest unpopular to Swift's family and friends, "Love Story" is based on Romeo and Juliet by William Shakespeare. In the lyrics, Swift replaced the original story's conclusion with a marriage proposal, an ending she believed the two characters deserved. The optimistic "Love Story" is contradicted by "White Horse", which was inspired by the same love interest. In "White Horse", Swift is disillusioned that the love interest is not her ideal Prince Charming who could treat her like a princess after his unfaithfulness. "Hey Stephen" is about Swift's hidden feelings for Stephen Barker Liles of Love and Theft, a country-music band that had opened shows for her. Heartbreak and emotional tumult are explored in songs such as "Tell Me Why", about an on-and-off relationship with an informal love interest; "You're Not Sorry", with lyrics describing an unfaithful man; and "Forever & Always", inspired by Swift's breakup with singer Joe Jonas.

Other songs were inspired by romantic relationships of Swift's friends. Swift wrote "You Belong with Me" after overhearing one of her band members speaking to his unsympathetic girlfriend over the phone. Out of sympathy, she wrote a story in which the protagonist harbors feelings for an out-of-reach love interest. The lyrics feature high school iconography, describing the protagonist as an ordinary girl "on the bleachers", and the antagonistic girlfriend as a popular cheer captain. In "The Way I Loved You", Swift sings about her passionate feelings for a complicated ex-lover, despite her current relationship with a decent boyfriend. Apart from romance, Fearless explores friendship, family love, and life lessons from Swift's underdog perspective. "Breathe" is about a fallout with a close friend. She dedicated "The Best Day" to her mother after they went shopping together because Swift was turned down by her schoolmates. The lyrics of "Change"—the closing track of the standard edition—detail Swift's determination to succeed despite her underdog status as a singer from a small, independent record label in Nashville. She finished writing "Change" the night she won the Horizon Award at the 2007 Country Music Association Awards.

Music 
A country pop album, Fearless follows the country styling of Swift's debut album. The tracks are characterized by instruments associated with country music such as fiddle, banjo, mandolin, and acoustic guitar, intertwined with dynamic electric guitar and strings in the build-up. The production is consistent throughout: each song follows a recurring verse-chorus-bridge structure and has a dramatic bridge, a stripped-down final verse, and a dramatic final refrain.

Music critics debated the album's genre. Stephen Thomas Erlewine of AllMusic and Hazel Cills of Pitchfork asserted that Fearless is more pop than country; Cills wrote that the only country elements on Fearless are Swift's "faux-country accent" and "a few bits" of banjo and fiddle scattered throughout the songs. Alison Bonaguro of The Chicago Tribune stated that Swift's music on the album was built upon "pop-leaning country arrangements". In mainstream reviews, critics wrote Fearless had crossover appeal with its styles ranging from teen pop and pop rock to soft rock and folk. Swift, in an interview with The Philadelphia Inquirer, responded to the critical debate: "[Whether] you tell stories about how you live on a farm and cherish your family and God, or whether you tell stories about being in high school and being cheated on, they're stories about your life. That's what makes me a country artist." In a retrospective review in 2021, Lindsay Zoladz from The New York Times wrote that Fearless is "still a country record, a snapshot of the moment" before Swift's transition to "pure pop". Chris DeVille from Stereogum agreed, noting that even though Swift herself was already making "pop star moves" in 2008, the music on Fearless was still "steeped in the sound of mainstream country".

Many of the songs contain radio-friendly country pop hooks, demonstrated through tracks such as "Fearless", "Fifteen", "Love Story", "You Belong with Me", "Tell Me Why", "The Way I Loved You", and "Change". Music scholar James E. Perone commented that the songs contain hints of country, pop, folk, and alternative rock with their instrumental mix. On "You Belong with Me", in addition to a banjo-led country pop production, the instrumental incorporates new wave-inspired electric guitar; Perone noted elements of 1980s new wave rock through the track's repeated eighth notes joined by fiddle, mandolin, and guitar. "Tell Me Why" opens with country fiddles and, in the mix, incorporates 1990s alternative rock and hip hop-inspired syncopated drum beats and rock-inspired guitars. The dynamic "The Way I Loved You" features distorted electric guitars with textual shifts that recall 1990s grunge. Other tracks with a more balladic production also feature pop hooks, such as "White Horse" and "You're Not Sorry". The standard edition's closing track, "The Best Day", features a stripped-down country rock production with guitar strums.

Release and promotion

Packaging 
Swift named the album Fearless inspired by the title track: "[Being] fearless doesn't mean you're completely unafraid and it doesn't mean that you're bulletproof. It means that you have a lot of fears, but you jump anyway." All the songs on the album reflected her "fearless" attitude to embrace the hardships and challenges in love and life. Swift was the booklet designer; Joseph Anthony Barker, Ash Newell, and Sheryl Nields were responsible for the photography; and Leen Ann Ramey designed the cover artwork. The thirteen-track standard edition was released on November 11, 2008, by Big Machine Records. An international edition, featuring three additional tracks—"Our Song", "Teardrops on My Guitar", and "Should've Said No"—was released on March 9, 2009, by Big Machine in partnership with Universal Music Group.

Swift announced a reissue of Fearless, subtitled Platinum Edition, on September 10, 2009. The reissue was released on October 26, 2009. The Platinum Edition package includes a CD and a DVD; the CD features six additional songs—"Jump Then Fall", "Untouchable", "Forever & Always" (Piano Version), "Come in with the Rain", "SuperStar", and "The Other Side of the Door"—placed prior to the original tracks. The DVD comprises the music videos for "Change", "The Best Day", "Love Story", "White Horse", and "You Belong with Me"; behind-the-scenes footage for the latter three; behind-the-scene footage from the first concert of the Fearless Tour; and "Thug Story"—a video Swift filmed with rapper T-Pain exclusively for the 2009 CMT Music Awards. "Untouchable" is a cover of rock band Luna Halo's 2007 song that had its lyrics and arrangement rewritten by Swift.

Marketing 

On June 8, 2008, Swift performed songs from Fearless on Clear Channel's Stripped; the performance was recorded and included in the Platinum Edition reissue. Prior to the album's commercial release, "Change" was made available via the iTunes Store on August 8 as a promotional single. It was included on the AT&T Team USA Soundtrack, a compilation of songs played during the United States' participation in the 2008 Summer Olympics. A digital campaign launched through the iTunes Store, called "Countdown to Fearless", featured one song released each week during the five weeks leading to the album's release. "Breathe" was released as a promotional single exclusively via Rhapsody on October 21, 2008.

Swift made many television appearances to promote Fearless throughout late 2008, performing on shows including The Ellen DeGeneres Show, Good Morning America, and Late Night with David Letterman. A special CMT Crossroads episode featuring Swift and rock band Def Leppard singing each other's songs was recorded on October 6 at the Roy Acuff Theater in Nashville, and aired on CMT on November 7, 2008. Her performances at awards shows that year included the Country Music Association Awards and the American Music Awards.

Besides live appearances, Swift used her MySpace account to promote to a young audience, sharing snippets of songs for streaming before they were released to radio, as she had done with her debut album. She continued to appear on televised events through 2009, hosting Saturday Night Live, and performing at awards shows including the 51st Annual Grammy Awards, the CMT Music Awards, and the Country Music Association Awards. At the 2009 MTV Video Music Awards, rapper-producer Kanye West interrupted Swift's acceptance speech for winning Best Female Video with "You Belong with Me"—an incident known as "Kanyegate", which prompted many internet memes and media coverage.

Five songs were released as singles from Fearless. The lead single, "Love Story", was released on September 15, 2008. It peaked atop the Hot Country Songs, and was the first country song to reach number one on the Mainstream Top 40, a Billboard chart monitoring pop radio in the U.S. The single peaked at number four on the U.S. Billboard Hot 100, and at number two on the UK Singles Chart, and was Swift's first number-one single in Australia. The four remaining singles were "White Horse" (December 8, 2008), "You Belong with Me" (April 20, 2009), "Fifteen" (August 31, 2009), and "Fearless" (January 4, 2010). All four peaked within the top forty of the Billboard Hot 100, with "You Belong with Me" peaking at number two as the highest-charting Fearless single, and within the top ten of the Hot Country Songs, with "You Belong with Me" reaching number one. "You Belong with Me", similar to "Love Story", was a crossover success. The song was the first country song to top the all-genre Radio Songs chart, driven mostly by non-country airplay.

Touring 

Swift announced the Fearless Tour, her first headlining tour, in January 2009. The tour started in Evansville, Indiana on April 23, and visited the U.S. and Canada over six months. Prior to the Fearless Tour, Swift headlined three U.S. music festivals: the San Antonio Stock Show & Rodeo in February 2009, and the Houston Livestock Show and Rodeo and the Florida Strawberry Festival in March. In October, when the first North American leg finished, Swift announced a second North American leg beginning on March 4, 2010, in Tampa, Florida. Outside North America, the Fearless Tour visited Australia and Japan in February 2010. The tour was met with high demand, selling out tickets within minutes. Swift wrapped up the Fearless Tour at the Gillette Stadium in Foxborough, Massachusetts on June 5, 2010. The tour grossed over $63 million and played to over 1.1 million fans.

Commercial performance 
Fearless was a commercial success in the U.S., setting many chart records and catapulting Swift to mainstream prominence. It spent eleven non-consecutive weeks at number one on the Billboard 200, the longest run of the 2000s decade. It holds the record for the most weeks at number one for a female country album. Thirteen album tracks (including from the Platinum Edition) peaked within the top forty of the Billboard Hot 100, setting a record for the album with the most such entries. Five tracks peaked within the top ten: "Fearless", "Love Story", "You Belong with Me", "Change", and "Jump Then Fall"; Fearless was the first album since Bruce Springsteen's Born in the U.S.A. (1984) to have five top-ten songs with none reaching number one.

With 3.217 million copies sold in the U.S. throughout 2009, it was the year's best-selling album in the country. The achievement made Swift, then twenty years old, the youngest artist and the only female country musician to have a best-selling album of a calendar year. It was the only album to spend its first full year in the top ten of the Billboard 200 of the 2000s decade, totaling fifty-eight weeks in the top ten, a record for a country musician. On the Top Country Albums chart, Fearless spent thirty-five weeks at number one. The Recording Industry Association of America (RIAA) certified Fearless diamond in December 2017, recognizing ten million units based on sales and stream. All singles were certified platinum or multi-platinum; the tracks "You're Not Sorry" and "Forever & Always" were certified platinum; and "Hey Stephen", "Breathe", "The Way I Loved You", "The Best Day", "Change", and "Jump Then Fall" were certified gold. By October 2020, the album had sold 7.21 million copies in the U.S.

Fearless marked Swift's first international chart success, peaking atop the charts of Canada and New Zealand. It peaked within the top five of the charts in Australia (number two), Scotland (number four), and Norway and the U.K. (number five). The album received multi-platinum certifications in multiple English-speaking countries, including double platinum by both the Irish Recording Music Association (IRMA) and the British Phonographic Industry (BPI), triple platinum by Recorded Music NZ (RMNZ), four times platinum by Music Canada, and seven times platinum by the Australian Recording Industry Association (ARIA).

The album reached the top ten on charts in Japan, and top twenty in Austria, Brazil, Germany, Greece, and Sweden. In Europe, it was awarded gold certifications by the Bundesverband Musikindustrie (BVMI) in Germany, the IFPI Austria, and the IFPI Norway; and a platinum certification by the IFPI Denmark. In Asia, Fearless was certified gold by the Recording Industry Association of Japan (RIAJ), nine times platinum by the Philippine Association of the Record Industry and double platinum by the Recording Industry Association Singapore (RIAS). As of April 2021, the album had sold twelve million copies worldwide.

Critical reception 

Fearless received generally positive reviews from music critics in the press. On Metacritic, which assigns an aggregated score out of 100 to reviews in mainstream publications, the album earned a score of 73, based on fourteen reviews.

Many critics lauded Swift's songwriting craftsmanship. Reviews published in The Boston Globe, Blender, Entertainment Weekly, The Village Voice, and USA Today remarked that Fearless was an honest and vulnerable record contrasting with albums by other teenage singers, thanks to Swift's self-penned songs. Other reviews from AllMusic, Billboard, and The Observer deemed the lyrics mature for her age. In MSN Music, Robert Christgau found the album's romantic idealism distasteful, but lauded Swift's songwriting skills as remarkable for a teenage artist. Jonathan Keefe from Slant Magazine agreed the songs were well-written, but felt they fell short of refinement.

Some critics praised Fearlesss crossover appeal. AllMusic Stephen Thomas Erlewine and The Boston Globe James Reed remarked that the album straddles the perceived boundary between country and pop; the former called it "one of the best mainstream pop albums of 2008". In Rolling Stone, Jody Rosen hailed Swift as a "songwriting savant with an intuitive gift for the verse-chorus-bridge architecture". Christgau commented that the songs are effective partly because of "the musical restraint of a strain of Nashville bigpop that avoids muscle-flexing rockism".

Other reviewers were divided over the production. Chris Richards of The Washington Post commended the radio-friendly tunes, but commented that the album is repetitive overall. Although Richards praised Swift's vocals, Keefe deemed them weak and strained, which blemishes the album with occasional breath controls and nasal tones. Alexis Petridis, reviewing Fearless for the British newspaper The Guardian, found the praise in the American press surprising. Petridis agreed Swift's songwriting was remarkable, but found the music "bland and uninventive", which left the audience "wondering if the world really needs any more music like this". The British magazine Q wrote: "Her giggly peers will find she speaks their language, while grown-ups will prefer her to keep quiet."

Accolades 
Fearless featured on 2008 year-end lists by the Associated Press (7th), Blender (32nd), Rolling Stone (39th), and The Village Voice Pazz & Jop (58th); and 2009 year-end list by The Guardian (40th). Jon Caramanica in The New York Times placed the album at number four on his list of 2008's best albums and called Swift "one of pop's finest songwriters". The most awarded country-music album in history, Fearless won Album of the Year at both the Country Music Association (CMA) Awards and the Academy of Country Music (ACM) Awards in 2009. It was awarded as the Top Selling Album by the Canadian Country Music Association (CCMA) twice in a row, in 2009 and 2010. At the American Music Awards of 2009, Fearless won Favorite Country Album and was nominated for  Favorite Pop/Rock Album. Its other accolades included a Teen Choice Award for Choice Female Album, a Sirus XM Indie Award for International Album of the Year, and a Juno Award nomination for International Album of the Year.

At the 52nd Annual Grammy Awards in February 2010, Fearless won Album of the Year and Best Country Album. The Album of the Year made Swift, then twenty years old, the youngest artist to win the award, a record she held until the 62nd Annual Grammy Awards in 2020, when Billie Eilish won Album of the Year at age eighteen. Swift is the second country-music artist to win the three highest awards for a country-music album by the ACM, the CMA, and the Grammys—after the Chicks with their 1999 album, Fly—and the first to further win the Grammy for Album of the Year for the same album. "White Horse" won two Grammy Awards that year: Best Female Country Vocal Performance and Best Country Song.

Impact and legacy 

According to Billboard, as of 2022, Fearless is one of the 15 best-performing 21st-century albums without any number-one singles on the Billboard Hot 100. The album's critical and commercial successes established Swift as a mainstream star beyond the country-music scene. Though Swift identified as a country music-artist, some critics considered Swift more of a pop artist after the crossover success of "Love Story" and "You Belong with Me"; she officially abandoned country with the release of her fifth studio album, 1989 (2014). Perone remarked that Fearless moved Swift's status from a "singer-songwriter prodigy to singer-songwriter superstar". In addition to Swift's musicianship, Perone attributed the album's commercial success to her marketing strategy; with enhanced bonus material for the CD instead of download, Fearless became "indicative of a 21st century marketing trend in CD recordings".

Swift's songwriting on Fearless cemented her trademark confessional narratives. Writing for Slate, critic Carl Wilson dubbed this technique "Swiftian". In a 2019 retrospective review of the album for Pitchfork, Cills commented that Fearless was a testament to Swift's abilities of writing timeless songs, noting the album's simplicity and earnestness. Cills remarked that amidst sexualized teen idols, "there was something novel about Swift being a teenager and writing about her reality in her own terms coming into that same mainstream space, redefining what 'teen pop' could sound like in the process". Other retrospective reviews attributed the album's enduring popularity to songs about universal feelings—heartbreak, frustration, first love, and aspirations. It placed number 99 on NPR's 2017 list of the "150 Greatest Albums Made by Women" and number 10 on Rolling Stone 2022 list of the "100 Greatest Country Albums of All Time". Billboard in 2022 reflected that the Grammy Award for Album of the Year that Swift was honored for the album attested to her 20-year-old talent as "one of the most important singer-songwriters of her generation".

Swift began re-recording her first six studio albums, including Fearless, in November 2020. The decision came after a public dispute between her and talent manager Scooter Braun, who acquired the masters of Swift's first six studio albums—which Swift had been trying to buy for years—following her departure from Big Machine Records in November 2018. The re-recording of Fearless, subtitled Taylor's Version, was released on April 9, 2021, through Republic Records. The Taylor's Version feature all tracks from the Platinum Edition, the Valentine's Day soundtrack single "Today Was a Fairytale" (2010), and six unreleased "From the Vault" tracks. Following the release of Fearless (Taylor's Version), the original reappeared on albums charts of several European countries, reaching a new peak at number two in Austria, Germany, and Norway, and number three in Switzerland.

Track listing 
Credits are adapted from the album's liner notes. Except where noted, all tracks are written by Taylor Swift.

Notes:
 "Untouchable" is a reworked version of Luna Halo's "Untouchable" (2007), written by Cary Barlowe, Nathan Barlowe, and Tommy Lee James.
 The three bonus tracks on the international version ("Our Song", "Teardrops on My Guitar", and "Should've Said No") are produced by Chapman only.

Personnel 
Credits are adapted from the album's liner notes.

 Taylor Swift – lead vocals, producer, songwriter, vocal harmony, acoustic guitar, booklet design
 Nathan Chapman – producer, acoustic guitar, bass guitar, electric guitar, keyboard, Hammond organ, mandolin, mixing, percussion, piano, programming, steel guitar, vocal harmony
 Scott Borchetta – executive producer
 Sammie Allan – backing vocals
 Joseph Anthony Baker – photography
 Steve Blackmon – mixing assistant
 Drew Bollman – mixing assistant
 Andrew Bowers – finger snapping
 Nicholas Brown – finger snapping
 Nick Buda – drums
 Kenzie Butler – assistant engineer, engineer
 Colbie Caillat – finger snapping, guest appearance
 Jason Campbell – production coordinator
 Chad Carlson – engineer, mixing, sound recording
 Joseph Cassell – wardrobe stylist
 Todd Cassetty – enhanced recording
 Carolyn Cooper – finger snapping
 Burrus Cox – finger snapping
 Eric Darken – percussion, vibraphone
 Shawn Daughtry – mixing assistant
 Dan Dugmore – steel guitar
 Lauren Elcanv – finger snapping
 Caitlin Evanson – vocal harmony
 Kyle Ford – assistant engineer, engineer
 Kyle Ginther – assistant engineer, engineer
 Kenny Greenberg – electric guitar
 Jed Hackett – engineer
 Rob Hajacos – fiddle
 Tony Harrell – Hammond organ, keyboard, piano
 Amos Heller – bass guitar
 Claire Indie – cello
 John Keefe – drums
 Tim Lauer – Hammond organ, keyboard, piano
 Matt Legge – assistant engineer, engineer
 Tim Marks – bass guitar
 Delaney McBride – finger snapping
 Emma McBride – finger snapping
 Justin McIntosh – graphic design
 Grant Mickelson – electric guitar
 Ash Newell – photography
 Justin Niebank – mixing
 Sheryl Nields – photography
 Mark Petaccia – assistant engineer, engineer
 Lee Ann Ramey – cover art, graphic design
 Sandi Spika – hair stylist, make-up artist, wardrobe stylist
 Bryan Sutton – acoustic guitar, mandolin
 Whitney Sutton – copy coordinator
 Todd Tidwell – assistant engineer, engineer, mixing assistant
 Ilya Toshinsky – banjo
 Lorrie Turk – make-up artist
 Brady Wardlaw – hair stylist
 Hank Williams – mastering
 Brian David Willis – engineer
 Al Wilson – percussion
 Jonathan Yudkin – cello, string arrangements, strings

Charts

Weekly charts

Year-end charts

Decade-end charts

All-time charts

Certifications and sales 

|-

|-

See also 
 Grammy Award records – Youngest artists to win Album of the Year
 List of Billboard 200 number-one albums of 2008
 List of Billboard 200 number-one albums of 2009
 List of Top Country Albums number ones of 2008
 List of Top Country Albums number ones of 2009
 List of Top Country Albums number ones of 2010
 List of number-one albums of 2008 (Canada)
 List of number-one albums from the 2000s (New Zealand)
 List of number-one country albums of 2010 (Australia)
 List of best-selling albums by women
 List of best-selling albums of the 21st century
 List of best-selling albums in the Philippines
 List of best-selling albums in the United States

Notes

References

Citations

Print sources 

 

Taylor Swift albums
Country pop albums
2008 albums
Albums produced by Nathan Chapman (record producer)
Albums produced by Taylor Swift
Big Machine Records albums
Grammy Award for Album of the Year
Grammy Award for Best Country Album
Canadian Country Music Association Top Selling Album albums